Lucas Eguibar Bretón (born 9 February 1994) is a Spanish snowboarder.

Career
At the moment, Lucas Eguibar has 5 world cup victories with 16 total podiums finishes.

He won the Europa Cup in season 2011/2012. In 2013 he won a gold medal at the 2013 FIS Junior World Championships in Erzurum, Turkey.

His first world cup podium was in Arosa, Switzerland on 9 March 2013. He made another podium at the world cup, finishing in 2nd position in Vallnord-Arcalís, Andorra on 12 January 2014. His first World Cup victory was in Veysonnaz, Switzerland on 14 March 2015, becoming the first Spanish snowboarder to win a snowboard world cup event.

He won the 2014–15 FIS Snowboard cross World Cup, becoming the first Spanish snowboarder that win a Cristal Globe. He finished third in the next season.

Lucas competed in his first Olympic Winter Games in 2014. He won all his races except for the semi-final, where he fell and was disqualified for missing a gate. Eguibar won small final and finished 7th in his very first Olympics.

World Cup podiums

Individual events

Team events

Olympic results

References

External links

1994 births
Spanish male snowboarders
Living people
Snowboarders at the 2014 Winter Olympics
Snowboarders at the 2018 Winter Olympics
Snowboarders at the 2022 Winter Olympics
Olympic snowboarders of Spain
Sportspeople from San Sebastián
21st-century Spanish people